Sylvi Riitta Saimo (née Sikiö, 12 November 1914 – 12 March 2004) was a Finnish sprint canoeist, farmer and politician. She was the first female Finnish Olympic Champion at the Summer Olympics, winning a gold medal in K-1 500 m at the 1952 Summer Olympics. She also competed in cross-country skiing, athletics and orienteering. She was a member of the Finnish Parliament from 1966 to 1978.

Personal life
Saimo was born in the former Finnish municipality of Jaakkima (currently Lakhdenpokhsky District, Russia) on 12 November 1914. She died in Laukaa in 2004.

Sports career
Saimo competed in several sports, including skiing, athletics, orienteering and canoeing. She won a gold medal in the K-1 500 m event at the 1952 Summer Olympics and finished sixth in 1948. That was first and only gold medal by Finnish woman at Summer Olympics, until Heli Rantanen won the javelin throw contest in 1996.

Saimo also won two gold medals at the 1950 ICF Canoe Sprint World Championships in Copenhagen, earning them in the K-1 500 m and K-2 500 m events (in K-2, jointly with Greta Grönholm).

Other sports achievements include winning a bronze medal at the Finnish championship in orienteering in 1939. In cross-country skiing, she won a bronze medal in the relay at the Finnish championships in 1947, while placing 5th individually in the 10 km distance.

Political career
Saimo was elected representative to the Finnish Parliament for the Centre Party from 1966 to 1978.

See also
List of Finnish Members of Parliament

References

External links

1914 births
2004 deaths
People from Lakhdenpokhsky District
People from Viipuri Province (Grand Duchy of Finland)
Centre Party (Finland) politicians
Members of the Parliament of Finland (1966–70)
Members of the Parliament of Finland (1970–72)
Members of the Parliament of Finland (1972–75)
Members of the Parliament of Finland (1975–79)
Canoeists at the 1948 Summer Olympics
Canoeists at the 1952 Summer Olympics
Finnish female canoeists
Olympic canoeists of Finland
Olympic gold medalists for Finland
Olympic medalists in canoeing
ICF Canoe Sprint World Championships medalists in kayak
Finnish sportsperson-politicians
Medalists at the 1952 Summer Olympics